Love Between Fairy and Devil is a 2022 Chinese television series based on the novel of the same name written by Jiu Lu Fei Xiang. Directed by Yi Zheng and Qian Jingwu, it stars Yu Shuxin and Dylan Wang in leading roles, also featuring Xu Haiqiao, Guo Xiaoting, and Zhang Linghe in prominent supporting roles. The series aired on iQIYI from August 7 to September 22, 2022.

Synopsis 
"A man's fate can be affected by any small thing. One false step makes a great difference. A man's life is doomed. Everything is circulation of karma. The Karma will never be depleted." Si Ming, senior Master of Arbiter Hall" 

The fearsome Lord Devil, Dong Fang Qing Cang (Dylan Wang), once wrought utter chaos in the realm of the gods, defeating entire clans and vanquishing all of his foes at the head of his fearsome demon army. One of the young women from the defeated army is reborn as a fairy named Xiao Lan Hua (Yu Shuxin) many thousands of years later. Lord Devil has long since been cursed and imprisoned in a magical tower – and has remained there for thousands of years.

But, due to a mishap, Xiao Lan Hua unwittingly sets him free, he thinks he is able to escape. He believes that all he needs to do is sacrifice Xiao Lan Hua and he will be free to unleash chaos again and conquer the known world. There is a twist, however. In the process of setting him free, some bizarre magic appears to have taken place – at first the two have “swapped” bodies, though they are able to sort that out quickly, there's another problem - somehow, when Xiao Lan Hua woke him, she cast the "one Heart Curse", which links them so that he suffers her injuries, her emotions, and would even die if she did, meaning the fearsome Lord Devil's life is at the mercy puny female fairy who doesn't even know the curse exists. Now that she is his biggest weakness, he has to protect her life in order to protect his own. But as he searches for a way to undo the spell, love begins to cast its own magic spell!

Cast

Main 
 Yu Shuxin as Orchid / Xiao Lanhua / Goddess Xi Yun
 Li Xiyuan as young Xi Yun
 Orchid is an orchid fairy who lives at  Arbiter Hall of Shui Yun Tian's Si-ming palace. Her duty is to organize and take care of her master's Destiny Books. When Orchid was still a small plant flower, her master accidentally spoiled her immortal root with wine. The accident resulted in issues with her cultivation of power. Her world is turned upside down in an instant as Dongfang Qingcang enters her life.

 Dylan Wang as Dongfang Qingcang
 Fang Xiaomo as teen Dongfang Qingcang
 Ren Yifan as young Dongfang Qingcang
 Dongfang Qingcang is the fearless and powerful leader of the Moon Tribe, whose primordial spirit was secretly sealed in Haotian Tower. Due to a mishap, Orchid unwittingly sets him free, and the two become magically connected. He is arrogant and unfeeling but thaws over time.

Supporting

Fairy Realm Shui Yun Tian 
 Xu Haiqiao as Rong Hao
 Chidi Nvzi’s apprentice, and the master of the Sea Market. Outwardly, he seems carefree and a bit flighty, while his sinister, manipulative side is well hidden from most around him. He loves his master, Chidi Nvzi, desperately.
 Guo Xiaoting as Chidi Nvzi
 Master of Rong Hao and former God of War of Shuiyuntian. In order to save the world's life, she sacrificed herself to seal 100,000 Moon Tribe soldiers. In the past, when traveling in Yunmengze, she met Rong Hao at a young age. Out of mercy, she rescued Rong Hao, but she intervened in the mortal life. The price was suffering for 30,000 years, and each life would be killed by the beloved person.
Zhang Linghe as Chang Heng
 The current God of War of Shuiyuntian. He’s been betrothed for a thousand years to the Goddess Xiyun whom he has never met, but this does not stop him from falling deeply in love with Orchid. He is often torn between protecting Orchid and protecting his kingdom throughout the drama.
 Wang Yueyi as Dan Yin
 A highborn fairy who is in love with Chang Heng.

Moon Tribe's Cang Yan Sea 
 Charles Lin as Shang Que
 Assistant of Dongfang Qingcang, who can switch forms between human and dragon. When Dongfang Qingcang was imprisoned in the Haotian tower, Shang Que kept his sword at the bottom of the river and waited 30,000 years for his master’s return.  He is a faithful and devoted disciple who follows orders well.
 Zhang Chenxiao as Xun Feng
 Dongfang Qingcang's younger brother. After Dongfang Qingcang was imprisoned in the Haotian Pagoda, Xunfeng established himself as the king and fought against the two kings of the north and the south. After Dongfang Qingcang returned to the Cangyan Sea, although he surrendered on the surface, he always wanted to get rid of him and launched a mutiny when Dongfang Qingcang and Orchid switched their bodies. Because Xun Feng witnessed Dongfang Qingcang killing his father, Lao Yuezun, when he was young, he was full of hatred for him. With the help of Orchid, Xun Feng learned the truth and the two brothers untied the knot and got back together.
 Zhao Bin as Elder Moon Lord
 Dongfang Qingcang's Father. 
 Zhang Bozhi as King of Nanyou
 Li Xizi as King of Beiyou

Sea Market / Haoshi City 
 Hong Xiao as Jie Li
 Orchid's best friend and a spy from the Sea Market, Jie Li had been an orphan since childhood. She saved money by cheating and opened a shop in the Sea Market. Because she had been accustomed to hypocrisy since she was a child, she didn't trust anyone and had no friends. Jie Li originally befriended Orchid to swindle her out of money, but naïve and trusting Orchid regarded her as a close friend. They eventually became real friends.
 Cheng Zi as Die Yi
 Loyal assisstant of the Sea Market's master (Rong Hao).

Special appearances 
Li Yitong as Si Ming
 Orchid's Master, in charge of all life. She is said to having left Shui Yun Tian to travel around the realms.
Chen Ruoxuan as Chang Yuan
 Si Ming‘s husband.

Episodes 
The series aired every Saturday, Sunday, and Monday with two episodes each, and VIP members could have early access to two more.

Original soundtrack

Awards and nominations

Production 

"Love Between Fairy and Devil" is adapted from the novel of the same name by Jiu Lu Feixiang. The script development of the show lasted more than 800 days, the preparatory period was more than 400 days, and the cast and crew reached more than 600. There are over 5,000 pieces of clothing and over 3,000 pieces of accessories. There are more than 20,000 pieces of art props, and it also uniquely integrates China's intangible cultural heritage into the creation of Xianxia theme. 5 major Chinese intangible cultural heritage art joined the creation, 32 kinds of intangible cultural heritage traditional crafts were presented, and 27 intangible cultural heritage craftsmen personally guided them, which is reflected in all aspects of Fuhua Dao. The producer of the show, Wang Yixu, said that the theme of the show is "love and peace".

Filming
The series spent 3 years in script development, and confirmed its cast on December 18, 2020. Filming commenced on February 14, 2021, and wrapped up on June 11, 2021.

Side story 
"Love Between Fairy and Devil" has caused a lot of discussion with its good reputation after it was broadcast. After the finale was broadcast, the popularity continued unabated. It was officially announced that "Love Between Fairy and Devil" will launch two extra episodes to benefit fans of the drama, and the news immediately aroused heated discussions among netizens.

References

External links
 
 
 
IQIYI TV Series official page at i QIYI en

Chinese fantasy television series
2022 Chinese television series debuts
Television shows based on Chinese novels
Xianxia television series
IQIYI original programming
IQIYI